Saul Scheidlinger (1918–2010) was an American psychotherapist. Scheidlinger was the 18th president (1982–1984) of the American Group Psychotherapy Association. He was Professor Emeritus of Psychiatry at the Albert Einstein College of Medicine and an adjunct professor of clinical psychology in psychiatry at the Weill Medical College of Cornell University.

Bibliography
Author
 
 

Editor

Further reading

References

1918 births
2010 deaths
American psychotherapists